Nadeau Bluff is a mainly ice-covered bluff just southwest of Giovinco Ice Piedmont, protruding into Canyon Glacier from that glacier's east side. Named by Advisory Committee on Antarctic Names (US-ACAN) for F.A. Nadeau, Jr., a member of the support party at McMurdo Station, 1963.

Cliffs of the Ross Dependency
Dufek Coast